Voluntary building demolition is the decision by either the landowner or a higher government body to demolish a structure for any number of reasons, ranging from severe structural damage to the redevelopment of the land the building sits upon. Involuntary (or unplanned) building demolitions, such as the collapse of a building during a severe earthquake or by a terrorist attack, are not included in this list.

Tallest voluntarily demolished buildings over 100 meters (328 feet) in height 
The demolition of especially high buildings presents unique challenges, especially when their location is within densely populated areas of their respective cities. Buildings in excess of 100 meters (328 ft) in height are most often deconstructed floor-by-floor down to the building's basement, as opposed to controlled implosion of the structure, which would most likely damage surrounding structures.

Tallest voluntarily demolished buildings 50 meters (164 feet) to 100 meters (328 feet) in height

References

 
Voluntary
Demolished